The Alipore Jail or Alipore Central Jail, also known as Presidency Correctional Home, is a prison in Alipore, Kolkata, where political prisoners were kept under British rule, among them Subhas Chandra Bose. It also housed the Alipore Jail Press. It is no longer in operation as a jail, having been shut down on February 20, 2019.
The jail site is being developed as an Independence museum in the name of the martyrs who were imprisoned and executed there. It is also sometimes used for film shoots.

Notable inmates
 Sri Aurobindo (May 1908 – May 1909), imprisoned after the Alipore bomb case. During his stay  he wrote a series of articles in Bengali in the journal Suprabhat, later published as Tales of Prison life. He later said, "I have spoken of a year's imprisonment. It would have been more appropriate to speak of a year's living in an ashram or a hermitage. The only result of the wrath of the British Government was that I found God."
 Dudu Miyan (1857–61)
 Subhas Chandra Bose
 K. Kamaraj (1930)
 Ramakrishna Biswas
 Bidhan Chandra Roy (1930)
 Parul Mukherjee (1930s)
 Charu Mazumdar
 Pramod Ranjan Choudhury (1926)
 Dr. Jack Preger, MBE (1981)
 P. Kakkan
 Charu Chandra Bose

References

External links
 Martyrs of Indian Freedom

Alipore
Buildings and structures in Kolkata
Alipore
Law enforcement in West Bengal
1910 establishments in British India